Jo Berger Myhre (born 29 May 1984 in Sandefjord, Norway) is a Norwegian upright bassist, known from performing with the likes of Splashgirl, Blokk 5, Ingrid Olava, Solveig Slettahjell Slow Motion Quintet and Finland: Grydeland/Qvenild/Hausken/Myhre. As a member of the  Nils Petter Molvær Quartet (since 2013) he is performing as a bass guitarist and has contributed to two albums, Switch (2014) and Buoyancy (2016), to the last even as a co-producer.

Career 
Living in Oslo, Myhre holds a Bachelor degree in performing improvisational music from the Norwegian Academy of Music. In addition he attended one year studies under Anders Jormin at the Music Academy in Gothenburg, Sweden. He has a series of his own ongoing projects, but most active is with Splashgirl, a trio including with Andreas Stensland Løwe (piano and keyboards) and Andreas Lønso Knudsrød (drums and percussion) Their latest albums Huntsville (2011) and Field Day Rituals (2013).

Discography

Blokk 5 
2005: Casio Killed the Cornette (Blokk 5)

Splashgirl
2007: Doors. Keys (AIM Records)
2009: Arbor (Hubro Music)
2011: Pressure (Hubro Music)
2013: Field Day Rituals (Hubro Music)

Solveig Slettahjell
2011: Domestic Songs (Curling Legs)

Ingrid Olava
2008: Only Just Begun (EMI Music)
2008: Juliet's Wishes (Virgin Records)
2009: Tarpan Seasons (EmArcy, Universal Music, Norway), with Slow Motion Orchestra
2010: The Guest (Universal Music, Norway)

Torgeir Vassvik
2008: Sápmi (Idut)
	 	
Lasse Passage
2009: If You Don't Have Time To Cook, You Don't Have Time To Live (LP Records)

Jessica Sligter / Jæ
2010: Balls And Kittens, Draught And Strangling Rain (Hubro Music)
2012: Fear and the Framing (Hubro Music)

Susanna Wallumrød
2011: Jeg Vil Hjem Til Menneskene (Grappa Music)
2012: Wild Dog (Rune Grammofon)

Randi Tytingvåg
2013: Grounding (Ozella)

Finland including with Morten Qvenild, Ivar Grydeland, Pål Hausken
2015: Rainy Omen (Hubro Music)

With Nils Petter Molvær, Erland Dahlen, Geir Sundstøl
2014: Switch  (OKeh Records)
2016: Buoyancy'' (OKeh Records)

References

External links 
 Jon Berger Myhre Discography at Discogs.com

1984 births
Living people
21st-century double-bassists
21st-century Norwegian bass guitarists
21st-century Norwegian male singers
21st-century Norwegian singers
Jazz double-bassists
Male double-bassists
Male jazz composers
Norwegian jazz upright-bassists
Norwegian jazz bass guitarists
Norwegian male bass guitarists
Norwegian jazz composers
Norwegian Academy of Music alumni
Musicians from Sandefjord
Splashgirl members